The European Junior Championships can refer to:

European Junior Alpine Skiing Championships
EFAF European Junior Championship, biennial American football tournament
European Athletics Junior Championships
European Junior Badminton Championships
European Junior Baseball Championship
European Junior Boxing Championships
European Junior Chess Championship
European Junior Equestrian Vaulting Championships
European Cadet and Junior Fencing Championships
Finswimming European Junior Championship
European Men's Junior Handball Championship (under-20)
Women's European Junior Handball Championship (under-20)
IIHF European Junior Championships, defunct ice hockey tournament
European Junior Judo Championships
European Junior Natural Track Luge Championships
EBSA European Under-21 Snooker Championships
European Softball Junior Boys Championship
European Softball Junior Girls Championship
Individual Speedway Junior European Championship (under-19)
Team Speedway Junior European Championship (under-19)
European Rowing Junior Championships (under-18)
European Junior Squash Championships (under-19)
European Junior Swimming Championships
European Junior Taekwondo Championships
Tennis European Junior Championships
Men's Junior European Volleyball Championship (under-21)
Women's Junior European Volleyball Championship (under-20)
European Junior Wrestling Championships

See also 
European Championship
European Champion Clubs Cup for Junior
European Junior Curling Challenge
European Trophy Junior
European Junior Cup